The Inline Skating Club of America is a skating facility located in North Arlington, New Jersey.  It is the home of the New Jersey Grizzlies of the Professional Inline Hockey Association Pro Division (PIHA Pro) and the Wallington Grizzlies of the Professional Inline Hockey Association Minor League (PIHAML).

References

External links
 

Inline skating
North Arlington, New Jersey